WJCL could refer to:

WJCL-FM, a radio station (96.5 FM) licensed to Savannah, Georgia, United States
WJCL (TV), a television station (channel 22) licensed to Savannah, Georgia, United States